Adam is a surname.

The surname Adam is most prevalent in Sudan, and has the most bearer density in Maldives.

People with the surname 
 Adolphe Adam (1803–1856), French composer and music critic
 Aimé Adam (1913–2009), Canadian politician
 Albrecht Adam (1786–1862), German painter
 André Adam (1911–1991), French sociologist
 André Adam (1936–2016), Belgian-French diplomat
 Benno Adam (1812–1892), German painter
 Bidwell Adam (1894–1982), American politician
 Brian Adam (1948–2013), Member of the Scottish Parliament
 Charles Adam (1780–1853), British naval officer
 Charlie Adam (footballer, born 1962) (1962–2012), Scottish football player
 Charlie Adam (born 1985), Scottish football player
 Corinna Adam (1937–2012), British journalist
 Dietrich Adam (1953–2020), German television actor
 Emil Adam (1843–1924), German painter
 Eugen Adam (1817–1880), German painter
 François Gaspard Adam (1710–1761), French sculptor
 Franz Adam (1815–1886), German painter
 Frederick Adam (1781–1853), Scottish major-general
 Georgina Adam, British art market journalist
 Germanos Adam (1725–1809), Melkite Catholic bishop and Christian theologian
 Graeme Mercer Adam (1839–1912), Canadian author, editor, and publisher
 Grant Adam (born 1991), Scottish football player
 Ebenezer Adam (1919–2011), Ghanaian politician
 Hans Ritter von Adam (1886-1917), German flying ace
 Heinrich Adam (1787–1862), German painter
 Helen Adam (1909–1993), Scottish-American poet
 Ioan Adam (1875–1911), Romanian writer
 Jacob Adam (1748–1811), Austrian copper etcher
 James Adam (architect) (1732–1794), Scottish architect, brother of Robert Adam
 James Adam (classicist), Scottish Classics scholar
 Jason Adam (born 1991), American baseball player
 Jean Adam (1704–1765), Scottish poet
 Jenő Ádám (1896–1982), Hungarian composer and music educator
 Johann Friedrich Adam (died 1806), Russian botanist, later called Michael Friedrich Adams
 John Adam (actor), Australian actor
 John Adam (architect) (1721–1792), one of the Adam Brothers, Scottish 18th century architects
 John Adam (hoax), the name given by Islamic militants to a U.S. soldier they claimed to have captured
 John Adam (India) (1779–1825), British administrator, acting governor-general of the British East India Company
 John Adam (rugby league footballer), Australian rugby league player and inaugural head of the players union
 Jonathan Adam (born 1984), British racing driver
 Juliette Adam (1836–1936), French writer
 Julius Adam (1852–1913), German painter
 Jumaat Haji Adam (born 1956), botanist
 Karen Adam ( 2020s), Scottish politician
 Karl Adam (theologian) (1876–1966), German Catholic theologian
 Karl Adam (rowing coach) (1912–1976), German rowing coach
 Karl Adam (footballer) (1924–1999), German football player
 Ken Adam (1921–2016), British production designer
 Kenneth Adam (1908–1978), English journalist and broadcasting executive
 Lambert-Sigisbert Adam (1700–1759), French sculptor
 Louis Adam (1758–1848), French composer, music teacher, and piano virtuoso
 Lucien Adam (1833–1918), French linguist
 Madge Adam (1912–2001), English astronomer
 Maisie Adam (born 1994), English comedian, writer and actress
 Melchior Adam (1575–1622), German historian
 Mihai Adam (1940–2015), Romanian footballer
 Mike Adam (born 1981), Canadian curler
 Nicolas-Sébastien Adam (1705–1778), also called "Adam the Younger", French sculptor
 Omer Adam (born 1993), Israeli singer
 Piers Adam (born 1964), British businessman, owner of London nightclubs
 Rebecca Adam, Australian lawyer and business executive
 Robert Adam (1728–1792), Scottish architect, creator of the Adam style
 Roger Adam, French aeronautical engineer
 Shiraz Adam, Canadian actor
 Sir Ronald Forbes Adam, 2nd Baronet (1885–1982), British Army General
 Ron Adam, Canadian football player
 Ronald Adam (actor) (1896–1979), British actor
 Shaiful Edham Adam (1976–1999), Singaporean convicted murderer
 Shea Adam, American auto racing reporter
 Stéphane Adam (born 1969), French football player
 Theo Adam (1926–2019), German opera singer
 Udi Adam (born 1959), Israeli general
 Ulrich Adam (born 1950), German politician
 Will Adam, Church of England priest
 William Adam (architect) (1689–1748), Scottish architect, mason, and entrepreneur
 William Adam (MP) (1751–1839), Scottish Member of Parliament (MP) and judge
 William Adam (artist) (1846–1931), English landscape artist who worked in California
 William Adam (malacologist) (1909–1988), Belgian malacologist
 William Adam (trumpeter) (1917–2013), American trumpeter, and academic
 Yekutiel Adam (1927–1982), Israeli general

Scottish Adam family members 
 William Adam (1689–1748), Scottish architect and builder, born near Kirkcaldy, Fife
 John Adam (1721–1792), born near Kirkcaldy, eldest son of William, architect and builder
 William Adam (1751–1839), only son of John Adam, Member of Parliament and judge
 Charles Adam (1780–1853), second son of William Adam (1751–1839), British naval officer
 William Patrick Adam (1823–1881), son of Charles Adam, British Liberal politician, Governor of Madras 1880–1881
 Frederick Adam (1784–1853), fourth son of William Adam (1751–1839), General in the British Army, Governor of Madras 1832–1837
 Robert Adam (1728–1792), born near Kirkcaldy, second son of William. Architect, interior designer and furniture designer, originator of the "Adam style"
 James Adam (1732–1794), born in Edinburgh, third son of William. Architect and furniture designer, business partner of Robert

See also 
 Adam (given name)
 Adamyan, an Armenian surname derived from Adam

References

Notes 

Scottish families
Surnames of Breton origin
Surnames from given names